Euryestola antennalis is a species of beetle in the family Cerambycidae. It was described by Breuning in 1940. It is known from Venezuela and Brazil.

References

Calliini
Beetles described in 1940